Super Deluxe is a 2019 Indian Tamil-language hyperlink film produced and directed by Thiagarajan Kumararaja, who also co-wrote the screenplay with Mysskin, Nalan Kumarasamy and Neelan K. Sekar. It featured an ensemble cast of Vijay Sethupathi, Fahadh Faasil, Samantha Akkineni, Ramya Krishnan, Mysskin, Gayathrie, Ashwanth Ashokkumar, Bagavathi Perumal and Mirnalini Ravi. The film featured cinematography handled jointly by P. S. Vinod and Nirav Shah, editing done by Sathyaraj Natarajan and music scored by Yuvan Shankar Raja. The film had four parallelly interwoven stories revolving around four individuals who find themselves in the most unexpected predicaments, each poised to experience their destiny, all on one fateful day. The film marked Thiagarajan Kumararaja's return to direction, since his debut film Aaranya Kaandam released eight years ago, in 2011.

The film was theatrically released on 29 March 2019 and received critical acclaim, praising the performances of the cast, especially for that of Vijay Sethupathi, who essayed the role of a transgender. Super Deluxe was further screened at the Fantasia International Film Festival, the largest genre film festival in North America and Bucheon International Fantastic Film Festival. It was also featured in several Top 10 lists by several publications including The Times of India, The Indian Express, Sify and Film Companion. In 2019, Film Companion further ranked Vijay Sethupathi and Ashwanth Ashokkumar's performances in the list of "100 Greatest Performances of the Decade".

Super Deluxe won four Ananda Vikatan Cinema Awards, including Best Screenplay, Best Supporting Actor – Female (Ramya Krishnan), Best Cinematographer (P. S. Vinod and Nirav Shah), Best Music Director (Yuvan Shankar Raja). At the inaugural ceremony for Zee Cine Awards Tamil, Super Deluxe won five awards including Best Supporting Actor – Female (Ramya Krishnan), Best Child Artist (Ashwanth Ashokkumar), Best Editor (Sathyaraj Natarajan), Best Art Director (Vijay Adhinathan), and a Jury Special Award for Best Actress (Samantha Akkineni). The film further won two Edison Awards, four at the Critics' Choice Movie Awards including Best Movie of the Year and Best Film – Tamil, two awards at the Indian Film Festival of Melbourne, including a Honorary Award for Equality in Cinema, and a nomination at the 9th AACTA Awards, for Best Asian Film. On 22 March 2021, at the 67th National Film Awards held for Indian films released in 2019, Vijay Sethupathi won the National Film Award for Best Supporting Actor.

Awards and nominations

See also 
 List of Tamil films of 2019

Notes

References

External links 
 

Lists of accolades by Indian film